District is the third EP by the Pinoy rock band Sponge Cola, released under Universal Records last November 9, 2012.

Track listing and durations

Personnel
Yael Yuzon - vocals, rhythm guitar
Gosh Dilay - bass guitar, backup vocals
Erwin Armovit - lead guitar
Tmac Cruz - drums
Los Magno - rap (on tracks 4 & 5)
Sitti - Guest vocals (track 5)
Chito Miranda - Guest vocals (track 4)

References

2012 EPs
Sponge Cola albums